Sage Erickson (born December 28, 1990) is an American professional surfer born in Ojai, California, United States.

Career
At the age of nine, Erickson moved to the Island of Oahu, Hawaii. When she was 11, at Sunset Beach with her family, she picked up a board and paddled out. She got her first wave all the way in. After that, she began surfing everyday. At the age of 14, Erickson moved to Ventura, California, where she currently resides. She started her competitive surfing career when she was 14. She dominated  the NSSA and Pro Junior circuits, and in 2012, at age 21, she qualified for the Women's Association of Professional Surfing ASP, which is now called the World Surf League.

In 2016, Erickson ranked number 9 in the World Surfing Tour. Erickson has been featured on channels such as ESPN, GrindTV, and Surfer Magazine. In 2014, she was listed on Maxim as one of the top 100 Hottest women, ranking number 87. On January 15, 2021, Erickson appeared on the Los Angeles Rams YouTube channel, alongside Los Angeles Rams wide receiver Cooper Kupp and Sarina Morales, testing their sustainability knowledge.

Victories

Sponsors
Buell Wetsuits
CI Channel Islands Surfboard
Oakley
Freestyle watches
Perfect Fit
Db Journey

References

1990 births
Living people
World Surf League surfers
American female surfers
People from Ojai, California
Sportspeople from Ventura County, California
American surfers
21st-century American women